Brokenhead River Ecological Reserve is an ecological reserve on the Brokenhead River, Manitoba, Canada. It was established in 1978 under the Manitoba Crown Lands Act. It is a reserve that protects 66 hectares of forest. The forest is home to a variety of trees such as the oak, spruce, and elm. The forest is home to animals as well, which include, the red fox, snapping turtle, beaver, and mink.

See also
 List of ecological reserves in Manitoba
 List of protected areas of Manitoba

References

External links
 iNaturalist: Brokenhead River Ecological Reserve

Protected areas established in 1978
Ecological reserves of Manitoba
Nature reserves in Manitoba
Protected areas of Manitoba